Phoenicoprocta jamaicensis is a moth in the subfamily Arctiinae. It was described by Schaus in 1901. It is found on Jamaica.

References

Natural History Museum Lepidoptera generic names catalog

Moths described in 1901
Euchromiina